Ryan Cowen Julius (born 19 July 1995) is a South African field hockey player who plays as a forward for Dutch club Almeerse HC and the South African national team.

He competed in the 2020 Summer Olympics.

Club career
Julius only started playing hockey when he was 13 years old. He moved to the Netherlands in 2020 to play for Almeerse HC in the Hoofdklasse.

References

External links

1995 births
Living people
Field hockey players from Cape Town
Field hockey players at the 2020 Summer Olympics
Field hockey players at the 2018 Commonwealth Games
South African male field hockey players
Olympic field hockey players of South Africa
Male field hockey forwards
Male field hockey midfielders
Men's Hoofdklasse Hockey players
Field hockey players at the 2022 Commonwealth Games
21st-century South African people
2023 Men's FIH Hockey World Cup players

2018 FIH Indoor Hockey World Cup players
2023 FIH Indoor Hockey World Cup players